The 31st Filmfare Awards were held in 1984, with the Indian New Wave Cinema at its peak.

Betaab and Masoom led the ceremony with 8 nominations each, followed by Arth with 7 nominations and Ardh Satya with 6 nominations.

Ardh Satya and Masoom, both notable films of the Parallel Cinema genre, won 5 awards each, thus becoming the most-awarded films at the ceremony, with the former winning Best Film, Best Director (for Govind Nihalani) and Best Supporting Actor (for Sadashiv Amrapurkar), and the latter winning Best Actor (for Naseeruddin Shah).

Shabana Azmi set an unmatched record, becoming the only performer to receive 4 nominations for an award in a single year, earning 4 nominations for Best Actress for her performances in Arth, Avtaar, Mandi and Masoom, winning the award for Arth.

Naseeruddin Shah received dual nominations for Best Supporting Actor for his performances in Katha and Mandi, but lost to Sadashiv Amrapurkar who won the award for Ardh Satya.

Main awards

Best Film
 Ardh Satya 
Arth
Avtaar
Betaab
Masoom

Best Director
 Govind Nihalani – Ardh Satya 
Mahesh Bhatt – Arth
Mohan Kumar – Avtaar
Rahul Rawail – Betaab
Shekhar Kapoor – Masoom

Best Actor
 Naseeruddin Shah – Masoom 
Kamal Haasan – Sadma
Om Puri – Ardh Satya
Rajesh Khanna – Avtaar
Sunny Deol – Betaab

Best Actress
 Shabana Azmi – Arth 
Shabana Azmi – Avtaar
Shabana Azmi – Mandi
Shabana Azmi – Masoom
Sridevi – Sadma

Best Supporting Actor
 Sadashiv Amrapurkar – Ardh Satya 
Amitabh Bachchan – Andha Kanoon
Naseeruddin Shah – Katha
Naseeruddin Shah – Mandi
Raj Babbar – Agar Tum Na Hote

Best Supporting Actress
 Rohini Hattangadi – Arth 
Padmini Kolhapure – Souten
Rekha – Mujhe Insaaf Chahiye
Smita Patil – Arth
Smita Patil – Mandi

Best Comic Actor
 Utpal Dutt – Rang Birangi 
Deven Verma – Rang Birangi
Dharmendra – Naukar Biwi Ka
Kader Khan – Himmatwala
Shakti Kapoor – Mawaali

Best Story
 Ardh Satya – S.D. Panwalkar 
Arth – Mahesh Bhatt
Avtaar – Mohan Kumar
Betaab – Javed Akhtar
Sadma – Balu Mahendra

Best Screenplay
 Ardh Satya – Vijay Tendulkar

Best Dialogue
 Arth – Mahesh Bhatt

Best Music Director 
 Masoom – R.D. Burman 
Betaab – R.D. Burman
Hero – Laxmikant–Pyarelal
Razia Sultan – Khayyam
Souten – Usha Khanna

Best Lyricist
 Masoom – Gulzar for Tujhse Naraaz Nahin 
Agar Tum Na Hote – Gulshan Bawra for Agar Tum Na Hote
Betaab – Anand Bakshi for Jab Hum Jawaan Honge
Souten – Saawan Kumar for Shayad Meri Shaadi Ka Khayal
Souten – Saawan Kumar for Zindagi Pyaar Ka Geet

Best Playback Singer, Male
 Agar Tum Na Hote – Kishore Kumar for Agar Tum Na Hote 
Betaab – Shabbir Kumar for Jab Hum Jawaan Honge
Betaab – Shabbir Kumar for Parbaton Se Aaj
Ek Jaan Hain Hum – Shabbir Kumar for Yaad Teri Aayegi
Souten – Kishore Kumar for Shayad Meri Shaadi Ka Khayal

Best Playback Singer, Female
 Masoom – Aarti Mukherjee for Do Naina Ek Kahani 
Hero – Anuradha Paudwal for Tu Mera Hero Hai
Laal Chunariya – Chandrani Mukherjee for Aaja Ke Teri Raahon Mein

Best Art Direction
 Razia Sultan

Best Cinematography
 Vijeta

Best Sound
 Vijeta

Best Editing
 Vijeta

Critics' awards

Best Film
 Masoom

Best Documentary
 Veer Savarkar

Most Wins
Ardh Satya – 5/6
Masoom – 5/8
Vijeta – 3/3
Arth – 3/7
Betaab  – 0/8

References
https://www.imdb.com/event/ev0000245/1984/

See also
 55th Filmfare Awards
 Filmfare Awards

Filmfare Awards
Filmfare